Anchorvale is a neighbourhood of Sengkang New Town in Singapore between Sungei Punggol and Compassvale. House numbers of its public apartment blocks begin with the number '3' (3xx). These housing estates were fully completed by the Housing and Development Board (HDB) in 2001.

Educational institutions
Primary schools

 Anchor Green Primary School 安泰小学 Sekolah Rendah Anchor Green
 Nan Chiau Primary School 南桥小学 Sekolah Rendan Nan Chiau 
 Springdale Primary School 康德小学 Sekolah Rendah Springdale
Secondary schools
 Nan Chiau High School 南桥中学 Sekolah Tinggi Nan Chiau

Places of worship

Buddhist temple
 Puat Jit Buddhist Temple (般若念佛堂)

Chinese temples
 Nanyang Thong Hong Siang Tng Temple (南洋同奉善堂)
 Chee Hwan Kog Temple (济芳阁)

Church
 Sengkang Methodist Church

Other facilities
 Sengkang Sports Centre/Anchorvale Community Club
 Sengkang General Hospital

Public transport
The Anchorvale neighbourhood is linked to Sengkang Bus Interchange, Sengkang MRT/LRT station and Compassvale Bus Interchange at the town centre via bus services originating from the Sengkang Bus Interchange, Compassvale Bus Interchange and other parts of the island. The west loop of the Sengkang LRT line also serves the area, at the Cheng Lim, Farmway, Tongkang and Renjong LRT stations.

Service 110, which plies between Compassvale Bus Interchange and Changi Airport, connects residents to the four airport terminals and the bus stops along TPE before and after Punggol Road near Punggol Flyover. It also serves as an alternate service toward the airport for residents of the town centre, and Fernvale residents close to Anchorvale.

The neighborhood's eastern portion is in the vicinity of the Sengkang Town Centre. Many residents there also have direct access to Sengkang MRT/LRT station.

Gallery
Housing estates

Educational institutions

Places of worship

Other amenities

 
Sengkang